Cajus Julius Caesar (born 22 January 1951) is a German forester and politician of the CDU. He served in the Bundestag, the parliament of Germany, 1998–2005, 2007–2009 and 2011–2017.

Life 
Caesar was born in Rinteln. He worked in forestry and forestry administration from 1974 to 1998.

Caesar is a Protestant. He is married to Gudrun Caesar and has two sons and a daughter. The name "Cajus Julius Caesar", referencing the Roman general and politician Gaius Julius Caesar, has become a family tradition, although Caesar states that he can neither prove or disprove to be related to the ancient Roman. Both Caesar's father and one of his sons, a pilot, also share the name, as does his grandson. When he first met Minister of the Interior Wolfgang Schäuble, Caesar had to prove his name with his driver's license.

Political career 
Caesar became a member of the Junge Union and the CDU in 1969 and held various local chair positions in his party before becoming district chair in 1990. He was a member of the Bundestag 1998–2005, 2007–2009 and 2011–2017, always standing in the Lippe I constituency but elected via the CDU party list for North Rhine-Westphalia. In the 2005 German federal election, Caesar seemed to have won a seat but after a delayed election in Dresden I where the CDU candidate was elected, the seat fell to the Saarland party list instead. Caesar became a member of parliament again when Reinhard Göhner resigned his seat in 2007. After failing to be reelected in the 2009 German federal election, Caesar again replaced a retiring member, Leo Dautzenberg, from 2011 until 2017.

In 2018 Caesar was named the government's forestry representative by the Federal Minister of Agriculture Julia Klöckner.

References 

1951 births
Living people
People from Rinteln
Christian Democratic Union of Germany politicians
Members of the Bundestag for the Christian Democratic Union of Germany
Members of the Bundestag for North Rhine-Westphalia
Members of the Bundestag 1998–2002
Members of the Bundestag 2002–2005
Members of the Bundestag 2005–2009
Members of the Bundestag 2009–2013
Members of the Bundestag 2013–2017